Perth Amboy Branch could refer to several former railway lines:

 the Central Railroad of New Jersey's Elizabethport and Perth Amboy Branch
 Conrail's Chemical Coast Secondary, which incorporated the Central Railroad of New Jersey branch
 the Lehigh Valley Railroad's Perth Amboy Branch
 the United New Jersey Railroad and Canal Company's Perth Amboy and Woodbridge Branch